The following is a list of Nippon Professional Baseball players with the last name starting with A, retired or active.

A

References

External links
Japanese Baseball

 A